Chenillé-Changé is a former commune in the Maine-et-Loire department of western France, located on the river Mayenne 27 km northwest of Angers. On 1 January 2016, it was merged into the new commune of Chenillé-Champteussé.

See also
Communes of the Maine-et-Loire department

References

Chenillechange
Maine-et-Loire communes articles needing translation from French Wikipedia